Lim Kim (born Kim Ye-rim;  on January 21, 1994) is a South Korean singer and a member of the band Togeworl with Do Dae-yoon. She competed in the Superstar K3 singing competition as a member of Togeworl, placing third. In 2013, Kim debuted as a solo singer, and is known for the song "All Right." She left Mystic Entertainment after her contract ended in 2016.

Biography 

Kim was born in South Korea. For high school, she decided to go overseas, and attended Leonia High School in New Jersey. While attending high school in 2011, she heard about the New York City auditions for the South Korean singing competition Superstar K3. She asked a fellow Korean student Do Dae-yoon, who was known as a great guitarist at the school, to audition together, even though she did not know him well. He agreed, and they formed the band Togeworl. Togeworl managed to pass the audition, and flew to Seoul to compete. The duo were successful, and were picked to be mentored by singer-songwriter Yoon Jong-shin. Eventually they finished third in the competition, after Ulala Session and Busker Busker.

After the competition, Kim and Do remained in South Korea, where they continued to receive musical training, and signed a contract with Mystic89. Togeworl released their first song in February 2012 for the soundtrack for the TVN variety show The Romantic. Kim began attending high school in Bundang-gu, Seoul in March 2012.

In March 2012, Kim made an appearance in the drama Flower Band, and released two songs for the soundtrack, "Two Months" and "Love U Like U," which was a duet with L from the boyband Infinite.

Though Togeworl planned to debut in 2013, member Do Dae-yoon had to return to the United States, due to issues with high school. Because of this, it was decided Kim should debut as a solo artist before reuniting as a duo.

In June 2013, Kim released the extended play A Voice, led by the song "All Right." The song was successful, reaching number two on Gaon's singles chart. Then, she released a second extended play in September, Her Voice, and a full-length album in November called Goodbye 20.

In April 2015, she released her third extended play, Simple Mind. The track "Awoo" was the only K-pop song included on Spins 101 Best Songs of 2015, coming in at No. 51. In the article, Andrew Unterberger praised the song, saying "no [American] pop song this year breathed like this Korean emoji of a pop song" and calling it "a kinetic environment bursting with creativity, synthesis, and an intrinsic passion". Billboards 20 Best K-Pop Songs of 2015 ranked the song at No. 8, claiming that Kim outdid herself and praising the song's "mix of woozy synths, trance-like chants, and trappy snares [...] pulled off with a sense of sophistication that's hard to make believable."

On May 30, 2016, Mystic Entertainment posted an official statement announcing Kim's departure from the label after her contract has ended.

After an over-three-year hiatus, Lim Kim released "Sal-ki", her first published song as a rapper, on May 24, 2019. Her new EP Generasian was released independently on October 15, 2019. Generasian won the award for Best Dance & Electronic Album and "Sal-ki" won Best Dance & Electronic Song at the 2020 Korean Music Awards.

On December 9, 2021, Kim signed a contract with New Entry.

Discography

Studio albums

Extended plays

Single albums

Singles

Other charted songs

Participation in albums

Filmography

Television

Awards and nominations

Notes

References

External links

1994 births
Living people
Mystic Entertainment artists
Leonia High School alumni
South Korean women pop singers
South Korean female idols
South Korean folk rock singers
South Korean television actresses
Superstar K participants
21st-century South Korean singers
Melon Music Award winners
Korean Music Award winners
Golden Disc Award winners
21st-century South Korean women singers